Strana (Страна) was a liberal-bourgeois daily newspaper published in St. Petersburg, Russia, in 1906 and 1907.

References

Newspapers published in the Russian Empire
Mass media in Saint Petersburg